This article comprises four sortable tables of mountain summits of the United States that are higher than any other point north or south of their latitude or east or west of their longitude in the U.S.

The summit of a mountain or hill may be measured in three principal ways:
The topographic elevation of a summit measures the height of the summit above a geodetic sea level.
The topographic prominence of a summit is a measure of how high the summit rises above its surroundings.
The topographic isolation (or radius of dominance) of a summit measures how far the summit lies from its nearest point of equal elevation.



Northernmost high summits

Southernmost high summits

Easternmost high summits

Westernmost high summits

Gallery

See also

List of mountain peaks of North America
List of mountain peaks of Greenland
List of mountain peaks of Canada
List of mountain peaks of the Rocky Mountains
List of mountain peaks of the United States
List of the highest major summits of the United States
List of the major 4000-meter summits of the United States
List of the major 3000-meter summits of the United States
List of United States fourteeners
List of the most prominent summits of the United States
List of the ultra-prominent summits of the United States
List of the most isolated major summits of the United States
List of the major 100-kilometer summits of the United States

List of mountain peaks of Alaska
List of mountain peaks of California
List of mountain peaks of Colorado
List of mountain peaks of Hawaii
List of mountain peaks of Montana
List of mountain peaks of Nevada
List of mountain peaks of Utah
List of mountain peaks of Washington (state)
List of mountain peaks of Wyoming
List of mountain peaks of México
List of mountain peaks of Central America
List of mountain peaks of the Caribbean
United States of America
Geography of the United States
Geology of the United States
:Category:Mountains of the United States
commons:Category:Mountains of the United States
Physical geography
Topography
Topographic elevation
Topographic prominence
Topographic isolation

Notes

References

External links

United States Geological Survey (USGS)
Geographic Names Information System @ USGS
United States National Geodetic Survey (NGS)
Geodetic Glossary @ NGS
NGVD 29 to NAVD 88 online elevation converter @ NGS
Survey Marks and Datasheets @ NGS
Bivouac.com
Peakbagger.com
Peaklist.org
Peakware.com
Summitpost.org

Extreme
Extreme Summits